Crime Crackdown is a 2021 Chinese crime drama series written by Du Liang and directed by Wu Bai, and starring Sun Honglei, Lay Zhang and Liu Yijun. Based on several real-life cases that shook China in the 2010s, the series picks up a national anti-gang supervising group and local police officers as they take on gangs and the corrupt officials that offer these illegal groups a "protective umbrella". The series premiered on Dragon Television and Beijing TV on 9 August 2021.

Cast

Main
Sun Honglei as Li Chengyang, former criminal police, the current executive vice president (later acting president) and legal adviser of Xinshuai Group.
Lay Zhang as Lin Hao, criminal police.
Liu Yijun as He Yong, criminal police and leader of the 915 Task Force.

Supporting
Wu Yue as He Yun, executive deputy director of lüteng Municipal Public Security Bureau and director of its Anti-Gang Office, mother of Sun Xing(spoil alert).
Jiang Shuying as Huang Xi, a reporter, niece of He Yun.
Wang Zhifei as Gao Mingyuan, chairman of Changteng Capital.
Liu Zhibing as Luo Shanhe, leader of the 36th Steering Group of the Central Anti-Triad and Evil Forces.
Wu Xiaoliang as Sun Xing (birth name Gao He), boss of a naked loan company, son of Gao Mingyuan and He Yun.
Ning Li as Ma Shuai, chairman of Xinshuai Group.
Che Xiao as Li Lijuan, a director of Xinshuai Group, wife of Ma Shuai.
Su Ke as Da Jiang, a gang member, best buddy of Li Chengyang.
Tan Kai as Dong Yao, governor of Shimen District in lüteng.
Hou Changrong as Zhao Ligen, executive deputy secretary of the Political and Legal Affairs Commission of Zhongjiang Province and director of the Provincial Anti-Gang Office.
Sun Hao as Hu Xiaowei, local police station director.
Zhou Xiao'ou as Chen Jianbo, boss of Jian'an Civil Explosion Company.
Wang Jundi as Zheng Yihong, president of Hezhong Media Company, adopted daughter of Gao Mingyuan.
Zhou Zhi as Yu Jingjing
Zhao Xiaorui as Cao Peng, communist party secretary of Yihe village.
Zheng Xiaoning as Wang Zheng, executive vice governor of Zhongjiang Province.
Jiang Ruijia as Mai Jia, mistress of Gao Mingyuan.
Jiang Han as Cao Xiaofeng, son of Cao Peng.
Guo Qiucheng as Xie Zhonglin, mayor of lüteng.

Soundtrack

Production
In May 2019, Huang Xing and Li Yue had joined the project as general producers. They received support from the Central Political and Legal Affairs Commission, which gave them access to case files. The series took inspiration from Sun Xiaoguo's case in Yunnan, Huang Hongfa's case in Hainan, and Du Shaoping's case and Wen Liehong's case in Hunan.

Reception
Crime Crackdown earned a 7.3/10 on Chinese media review platform Douban from more than 277,000 reviews and nearly 2.70 billion views on Chinese streaming platform Tencent Video.

References

External links
 
 
 

2021 Chinese television series debuts
2021 Chinese television series endings
Political drama television series
Chinese crime television series
Triad (organized crime)